Atlantic Island Air was an Icelandic airline that existed in the early 1990s.

Another airline with a similar name was Atlantic Island Airways which operated scheduled passenger service in eastern Canada with Fokker F28 Fellowship jet aircraft in 1995.

Fleet

The Atlantic Island Air fleet consisted of the following aircraft:

 1 Boeing 727-200
 1 Boeing 737-200

References

External links

Pictures of Atlantic Island Air from Airliners.net

Defunct airlines of Iceland
Airlines established in 1990
Airlines disestablished in 1992
1990 establishments in Iceland